Cincinnatus Heine Miller (September 8, 1837 – February 17, 1913), better known by his pen name Joaquin Miller, was an American poet, author, and frontiersman. He is nicknamed the "Poet of the Sierras" after the Sierra Nevada, about which he wrote in his Songs of the Sierras (1871).

Life

Early years and family
Joaquin Miller's parents were Hulings Miller and Margaret (née Witt), who married January 3, 1836, in Union County, Indiana. Their second son, Cincinnatus Hiner Miller, was born in 1837 near Union County, Indiana. For unknown reasons, Miller later claimed his birth date was November 10, 1841. He said he was born in Millersville, Indiana, a town he claimed was founded by his father, while on a wagon heading west.<ref name=Hapke21>Hapke, Laura. Girls Who Went Wrong: Prostitutes in American Fiction, 1885-1917. Popular Press, 1989: 21. </ref> After leaving Union County, Miller's father then moved the family to Grant County, Indiana to a location near the Mississinewa River and near the Miami Indian Reservation. Besides adopting the pen name "Joaquin", he later changed his middle name from Hiner to Heine to evoke the German poet Heinrich Heine.

While Miller was a young boy, probably between 1850 and 1852, his family moved to Oregon and settled in the Willamette Valley, establishing a farm in what would become Lane County.

As a young man, he moved to northern California during the California Gold Rush years, and had a variety of adventures, including spending a year living in a Native American village, and being wounded in a battle with Native Americans. A number of his popular works, Life Amongst the Modocs, An Elk Hunt, and The Battle of Castle Crags, draw on these experiences. He was wounded in the cheek and neck with an arrow during this latter battle, recuperating at the Gold Rush-era mining town of Portuguese Flat.

Wanderings and early writings
He accompanied William Walker on the latter's 1855 filibustering expedition to Nicaragua. In the spring of 1857, Miller took part in an expedition against the Pit River Tribe after they killed a white man on Pit River. Years later, he claimed that he had sided with the Native Americans and was run out of town for it. He was widely rumored to have married an Indian woman, possibly a Wintu princess who nursed him back to health after he was wounded by Modocs, and to have fathered with her a daughter named Cali-Shasta, or "Lily of the Shasta." Although Miller soon left the area to pursue other adventures, in the 1870s he sought out Cali-Shasta, then in her teens, and took her to San Francisco to be educated by his friend Ina Coolbrith. Contemporaries believed that Miller's "Indian wife" was the woman later kidnapped by Modocs and held in captivity for some years until rescued by a man named Jim Brock (whom she married), but when "Amanda Brock" died in 1909, Miller denied news reports describing his supposed romance with her. He credited her with saving his life, but said she had always been a platonic friend.

Spending a short time in the mining camps of northern Idaho, Miller found his way to Canyon City, Oregon by 1864 where he was elected the third Judge of Grant County. His old cabin in Canyon City is still standing.

Miller's exploits included a variety of occupations: mining-camp cook (who came down with scurvy from only eating what he cooked), lawyer and a judge, newspaper writer, Pony Express rider, and horse thief. On July 10, 1859, Miller was caught stealing a horse gelding valued at $80, a saddle worth $15, and other items. He was jailed briefly in Shasta County for the crime, and various accounts give other incidents of his repeating this crime in California and Oregon.

Miller earned an estimated $3,000 working as a Pony Express rider, and used the money to move to Oregon. With the help of his friend, Senator Joseph Lane, he became editor of the Democratic Register in Eugene, a role he held from March 15 to September 20, 1862. Though no copies survive, it was known as sympathetic to the Confederacy until it was forced to shut down because of its treasonable character. That year, Miller married Theresa Dyer on September 12, 1862, in her home four days after meeting her in Port Orford, Oregon. He had corresponded with her after exchanging poems with her for critique and chasing away a competing suitor. She published poetry under the pen name "Minnie Myrtle" and later, as Minnie Myrtle Miller. The couple had three children: Maud, George, and Henry, although Miller would later claim the baby Henry was not his own.

In 1868, Miller paid for the publication of 500 copies of his first book of poetry, Specimens. It was unnoticed and Miller gave away more copies than he sold. Few have survived. The author's despair and disappointment was reflected in his second book, Joaquin et al., the next year.

Dyer filed for divorce on April 4, 1870, claiming they had a third child, Henry Mark, the year before and that Miller was "wholly" neglectful. The court declared them divorced on April 19 and Dyer was granted custody of the baby while the two older children were left in the care of her mother. Miller was ordered to pay $200 per year in child support. Miller believed the divorce prevented him from being nominated for a seat on the Oregon Supreme Court. He never denied her charges that he was neglectful of her and their children and was rarely home. He also may have had an affair with actress Adah Isaacs Menken shortly into the marriage.

Travels

Miller had sent a copy of Joaquin, et al. to Bret Harte, who offered advice that he avoid "faults of excess" and encouragingly wrote, "you are on your way to become a poet." The next summer, July 1870, Miller traveled to San Francisco with borrowed money and there befriended Charles Warren Stoddard and Ina Coolbrith. Stoddard was the first to meet him at the dock and, as he recalled, Miller's first words to him were, "Well, let us go and talk with the poets."

Miller went to England, where he was celebrated as a frontier oddity. There, in May 1871, Miller published Songs of the Sierras, the book which finalized his nickname as the "Poet of the Sierras". It was well received by the British press and members of the Pre-Raphaelite Brotherhood, particularly Dante Gabriel Rossetti and William Michael Rossetti.

While in England, he was one of the few Americans invited into the Savage Club along with Julian Hawthorne, son of Nathaniel Hawthorne. The younger Hawthorne referred to Miller as "a licensed libertine" but admitted to finding him "charming, amiable, and harmless". Rather abruptly, Miller left England in September 1871 and landed in New York. At the encouragement of family, he made his way to Easton, Pennsylvania to visit his dying brother before returning to Oregon; his father died shortly thereafter. Miller eventually settled in California, where he grew fruit and published his poems and other works.

In 1877, Miller adapted his First Fam'lies of the Sierras into a play, The Danites, or, the Heart of the Sierras. It opened on August 22 in New York with McKee Rankin as the main character. The anti-Mormon play, which featured Danites hunting the daughter of one of the murderers of Joseph Smith, became one of the most commercially successful in a series of anti-Mormon dramas at the time. The Spirit of the Times, however, attributed its success to curious audience members expecting a disastrous failure and instead discovering a good show: "The play proved to possess more than ordinary merit, and if it is not a great work, it is decidedly not a very bad one." The Danites was extended from a run of only a few days to one of seven straight weeks before moving to another theatre and, ultimately, was performed to such a degree that it rivaled the popularity of Uncle Tom's Cabin. It was published in book form later in 1877. Miller later admitted that he regretted the anti-Mormon tone.

Miller married for a third time on September 8, 1879 to Abigail Leland, in New York City.

Later years and death

In 1886, Miller published The Destruction of Gotham, a book which was one of the earliest to depict a prostitute as a heroine. That year, he moved to Oakland, California, and built a home for himself he nicknamed "The Abbey" on property he called "The Hights" . He remained there until his death in 1913.

Japanese poet Yone Noguchi came to The Hights in 1894 and spent the next four years there as an unpaid laborer in exchange for room and board. While living there, he published his first book, Seen or Unseen; or, Monologues of a Homeless Snail (1897). Though he referred to Miller as "the most natural man", Noguchi reflected on those years as his most difficult in the United States and later fictionalized his experience in The American Diary of a Japanese Girl.

In 1897, Miller traveled to the Yukon as a newspaper correspondent. He saw Alaska for the first time on July 30. His dispatches, many of which were written before reaching Alaska, incorrectly implied an easy and inexpensive trip. Miller himself nearly froze to death; two toes were lost to frostbite.

Miller died on February 17, 1913, surrounded by friends and family. His last words were recorded as "Take me away; take me away!" The poet had asked to be cremated by friends in the funeral pyre he built at The Hights with no religious ceremony and without being embalmed. His wishes were mostly ignored and the funeral on February 19 drew thousands of curious onlookers. The preacher who spoke referred to Miller as "the last of America's great poets." On May 23, members of the Bohemian Club of San Francisco and the Press Club returned to Miller's funeral pyre to burn the urn which contained his ashes, allowing them to scatter. He had left no will and his estate — estimated at $100,000 — was divided between his wife, Abigail and daughter, Juanita.

Critical response and reputation

Miller was championed, although not enthusiastically, by Bret Harte and Ambrose Bierce.  In his time, Miller was known for his dishonesty and womanizing. Bierce, his friend and contemporary, said of him, "In impugning Mr. Miller's veracity, or rather, in plainly declaring that he has none, I should be sorry to be understood as attributing a graver moral delinquency than he really has. He cannot, or will not, tell the truth, but he never tells a malicious or thrifty falsehood." Miller's response was, "I always wondered why God made Bierce."

Called the "Poet of the Sierras" and the "Byron of the Rockies", he may have been more of a celebrity in England than in his native U.S. Much of his reputation, however, came not from his poetry but from the image he created for himself by capitalizing on the stereotypical image of Western frontiersmen. As poet Bayard Taylor bitterly noted in 1876, British audiences "place the simulated savagery of Joaquin Miller beside the pure and serene muse of Longfellow." Critics made much of Miller's poor spelling and rhymes; he once rhymed "Goethe" and "teeth". Henry Cuyler Bunner satirized the error in a poem titled "Shake, Mulleary, and Go-ethe". Miller himself once admitted, "I'm damned if I could tell the difference between a hexameter and a pentameter to save my scalp."

The Westminster Review referred to Miller's poetry as "Whitman without the coarseness". For a time, Miller's poem "Columbus" was one of the most widely known American poems, memorized and recited by legions of schoolchildren. Miller is remembered today, among other reasons, for lines from his poem in honor of "Burns and Byron":

In men whom men condemn as ill
I find so much of goodness still.
In men whom men pronounce divine
I find so much of sin and blot
I do not dare to draw a line
Between the two, where God has not.

Legacy

A historical marker for his birthplace was unveiled October 10, 1915, on U.S. 27 north of Liberty in Union County, Indiana. Joaquin Miller Cabin is located in Washington, DC. The Hights, the Oakland home Miller built at the end of his life, was purchased by the city of Oakland in 1919, and is known as the Joaquin Miller House, located in Joaquin Miller Park. It is a designated California Historical Landmark. He planted the surrounding trees and he personally built, on the eminence to the north, his own funeral pyre and monuments dedicated to Moses, General John C. Frémont, and the poets Robert Browning and Elizabeth Barrett Browning. Several schools in California are named for him, including Miller Middle School in San Jose, Joaquin Miller Elementary School in Oakland, and Joaquin Miller Elementary School in Burbank.

Actor George Paulsin portrayed a youthful Joaquin Miller in the Death Valley Days episode "Early Candle Lighten", hosted by Dale Robertson. The episode, which aired April 24, 1970, marked Paulsin's first screen appearance and the last of the series' 452 episodes. In the story line, a cook at a gold camp in the Arizona Territory faces hanging for stealing nuggets from the miners. His assistant, "Nat Miller", played by Paulsin, thinks he can save his life by bringing the cook's sister from Tucson. It was at this gold camp that Miller perfected his penchant for western poetry.

In the 1978 British miniseries Lillie, actor Bruce Boa as Miller startles guests when Lillie Langtry arrives at a ball by scattering rose petals in her path.

In 2012, artist Mark Oliver created a large statue called "Joaquin's Book" in Hoo Hoo Park in McCloud, California. The location is near where Miller lived with the Wintus.

List of worksSpecimens (1868)Joaquin et al. (1869)Pacific Poems (1871)Songs of the Sierras (1871)Songs of the Sun-Lands (1873)Life Amongst the Modocs (1873)Arizonian (1874)First Fam'lies of the Sierras (1875–76)The One Fair Woman (1876)The Baroness of New York (1877)The Danites (1878)Songs of Italy (1878)Shadows of Shasta (1881)Memorie and rime (1884)The Destruction of Gotham (1886)Songs of the Soul (1896)True Bear Stories (1900)Chants for the Boer (1900)The Complete Poetical Works of Joaquin Miller (1902)As It Was in the Beginning (1903)The Building of the City Beautiful (1905)Light: A Narrative Poem (1907)Joaquin Miller's Poems, with an introduction and autobiography (6 vols., San Francisco, 1909–1910)The Danites in the Sierras (1910)49: The Gold-Seekers of the Sierras (1910)An Elk HuntThe Battle of Castle CragsNotes

References
Frost, Orcutt William. Joaquin Miller. Twayne Publishers, 1967.
Marberry, M. M. Splendid Poseur: Joaquin Miller—American Poet. New York: Thomas Y. Crowell Company, 1953.
Peterson, Martin Severin. Joaquin Miller: Literary Frontiersman''. Stanford University Press, 1937.

External links

Bibliography of Joaquin Miller by Margaret Guilford-Kardell and Scott McKeown
Chronology of Miller's life from The California Almanac and Reader
Biography from Literary Traveler
Guide to the Joaquin Miller Papers at The Bancroft Library
Joaquin Miller Park
"With the Poet of Light and Joy" 1905 article by Yone Noguchi published in The National Magazine 
 
 
 

1837 births
1913 deaths
Poets from Oregon
Writers from Oakland, California
People from Canyon City, Oregon
Oregon state court judges
History of the San Francisco Bay Area
19th-century American dramatists and playwrights
Pony Express riders
People from Liberty, Indiana
19th-century American poets
20th-century American poets
19th-century American male writers
20th-century American male writers
American male poets
American male dramatists and playwrights
Poets from Indiana
19th-century American judges
Members of the American Academy of Arts and Letters